Mark Robert Prausnitz is an American chemical engineer, currently Regents’ Professor and J. Erskine Love, Jr. Chair in Chemical & Biomolecular Engineering at the Georgia Institute of Technology, He also serves as Adjunct Professor of Biomedical Engineering at Emory University and Adjunct Professor of Chemical & Biomolecular Engineering at the Korea Advanced Institute of Science and Technology. He is  known for pioneering microneedle technology for minimally invasive drug and vaccine administration, which has found applications in transdermal, ocular, oral, and sustained release delivery systems.

He has published over 300 research papers in collaboration with over 100 different senior collaborations in universities, industry partners, and government. His publications have been cited more than 47,000 times with an h-index of 109 as of February 2022. He is also inventor on 70 US patents (issued or pending)

Biography 

Prausnitz received his bachelor’s degree in Chemical engineering from Stanford University in 1988. He joined ALZA corporation as junior chemical engineer (1988-1989) where he worked on transdermal drug delivery systems. He then  pursued graduate studies at Massachusetts Institute of Technology under the supervision of Robert S. Langer and James Weaver, and received his Ph.D. degree in Chemical Engineering in 1994, for a thesis “Electroporation of Tissue and Cells for Drug Delivery Applications”.

Teaching 

At Georgia Tech, he co-developed and taught with Andreas Bommarius two new interdisciplinary courses with a pharmaceutical focus – “Drug Design, Development, and Delivery” and “Pharmaceutical Development”

Contributions to science and medicine

Drug and vaccine delivery to the skin using microneedle patches 
Prausnitz is best known as the founder of Microneedle drug delivery, having published the first paper on microneedle use for drug delivery in 1998 , conducted the first clinical trials of drug and vaccine delivery using microneedles, founded seven companies based on the technologs. His microneedle patches painlessly applied to the skin for simplified vaccination are currently being studied in a phase 1/2 clinical trial of measles and rubella vaccination in West Africa with the Bill and Melinda Gates Foundation.

In 2007, Prausnitz published the first paper on ocular drug delivery using microneedles. In 2011, he co-founded Clearside Biomedical to further develop his foundational work on suprachoroidal space (SCS) delivery via microneedles for targeted injection into the eye. He has collaborated at  Emory University and elsewhere  to develop  hollow and solid microneedle systems to target drug delivery to sites of action within the eye in both the posterior and anterior segments.

Transdermal drug delivery using electroporation and other methods 
He published the first paper on skin electroporation and demonstrated its feasibility for transdermal drug delivery in 1993.

He has studied mechanisms of creating transient pores in cell membranes to promote intracellular delivery of biomolecules using electroporation, ultrasound-mediated cavitation, and laser-activated nanoparticles.

Co-founded companies 
Prausnitz is an entrepreneur who has co-founded several companies:

 Redeon (acquired by BioValve Technologies)
 Microneedle Systems
 Clearside Biomedical
 Micron Biomedical
 Microstar Biotech
 Aldena Therapeutics
 Vimela Therapeutics

Awards and honors 

 Fellow, American Institute for Medical and Biological Engineering (2009)
 Fellow, National Academy of Inventors (2014)
 Fellow, American Association of Pharmaceutical Scientists (2017)
 Fellow, Controlled Release Society (2018)

References 

American chemical engineers
Fellows of the National Academy of Inventors
American inventors
Stanford University alumni
Massachusetts Institute of Technology alumni
Georgia Tech faculty
Fellows of the American Institute for Medical and Biological Engineering
Year of birth missing (living people)
Living people